Carlo Simoneschi (25 August 1878 – 4 January 1943) was an Italian stage and film actor. He also directed a number of films during the silent era.

Selected filmography
 The Sack of Rome (1920)
 The Gift of the Morning (1932)
 Paradise (1932)
 Pergolesi (1932)
 Casta Diva (1935)
 Condottieri (1937)
 They've Kidnapped a Man (1938)
 Heartbeat (1939)
 Department Store (1939)
 Teresa Venerdì (1941)

References

Bibliography
 Mitchell, Charles P. The Great Composers Portrayed on Film, 1913 through 2002. McFarland, 2004.

External links

1878 births
1943 deaths
Italian male film actors
Italian male stage actors
Italian male silent film actors
20th-century Italian male actors
Italian film directors
Film people from Rome